Pi Leonis, Latinised from π Leonis, is a single star in the zodiac constellation Leo. It is a red-hued star that is visible to the naked eye with an apparent visual magnitude of 4.70. This object is located at a distance of some 410 light-years from the Sun based on parallax, and is drifting further away with a radial velocity of +22 km/s. Because the star lies near the ecliptic it is subject to occultations by the Moon.

This is an evolved, red giant star with a stellar classification of M2 III. With the supply of hydrogen at its core exhausted, it has expanded to 70 times the Sun's radius. According to the General Catalogue of Variable Stars, it is a suspected variable star with a maximum magnitude of 4.67. The age of Pi Leonis is estimated at 550 million years.

References

M-type giants
Suspected variables

Leo (constellation)
Leonis, Pi
Durchmusterung objects
Leonis, 29
086663
049029
3950